Victoria has only ever had about 10 tunnels on its railway network, with some others on private narrow gauge tramways. This is due to the relatively easy terrain through which most of the lines were built.

Main line tunnels

Bendigo line tunnels 
The Melbourne–Echuca railway or Bendigo line was commenced by the private Melbourne, Mount Alexander and Murray River Railway Company, but when the company experienced financial difficulties it was taken over by the Victorian colonial government in 1856, with the Victorian Railways Department being formed to operate the new public railway system. The line opened in five stages from February 1859 to September 1864, and was at the time the largest engineering undertaking in the colony. More than 6,000 men were involved in construction of the Bendigo line with the main contractors Cornish and Bruce undertaking the works. The line served a strategic economic need of serving the important goldfields of Castlemaine and Bendigo (then called Sandhurst), and capturing for Melbourne the trade in wool and other goods from northern Victoria and the Riverina which were formerly shipped through South Australia via the Murray River. Two tunnels were built on the line. The  Big Hill Tunnel, located between Kangaroo Flat and Ravenswood, south of Bendigo. Like the Elpinstone Tunnel, it was double-tracked when built, but was singled as part of the Regional Fast Rail project.

Cheviot Tunnel 
Cheviot tunnel was built for the extension of the Mansfield railway line from Yea and is located near Limestone, roughly halfway between Yea and Molesworth, where the line crosses the Black Range at McLoughlin's Gap. It was built in 1889, at a cost of £88,661/2/11, by contractors Kenny Bros. as part of the Yea to Cathkin section, but construction was delayed by accidents.

Tarrawarra Tunnel 
Tarrawarra Tunnel was built on the Healesville line, when the Lilydale-Melbourne railway was extended from Yarra Flats (now known as Yarra Glen) to Healesville. A 1 in 40 (2.5%) climb up to the 154.4-metre tunnel and a corresponding descent was required. The section of line through the tunnel opened on 1 March 1889.

South Geelong Tunnel 
South Geelong tunnel was built as part of the extension of the Geelong railway line towards Colac and runs for a distance of 422 metres underneath the edge of the town centre, between McKillop and Ryrie Streets. Construction was commenced on 15 October 1874 by contractors Overend and Robb. It has a typical horseshoe shape and is built of bluestone and brick. The first train ran through the tunnel on 13 January 1876 and official services commenced on 4 February the same year. Its steep grade limited haulage loads and sometimes required assistance from a bank engine.

Branch line tunnels

Geelong Harbour Tunnel 
The Geelong Harbour branch line ran from near the station to Cunningham Pier (originally Railway Pier), being constructed by 1859 to assist in the transfer of goods from the port. A tunnel was constructed just south of the station, running under the main Melbourne Road (Mercer Street) and with a steep-sided bluestone embanked cutting. The line was closed in the 1980s.

Portland Harbour Tunnel 
The similar Portland harbour tunnel was constructed in 1877 in Portland, Victoria to link the main harbour with the railway, running under Bentink Street and emerging at the base of the shoreline cliffs. This line was later closed and a loop line constructed around the town to the new breakwater harbour.

Metropolitan lines

Hurstbridge Line tunnels 
The Hurstbridge Line tunnels are three tunnels on the suburban Hurstbridge line. Two were built in 1901-2 when the direct line from East Melbourne to Victoria Park was constructed. They are located at Jolimont and West Richmond; the first under Wellington Parade, and the second under Hoddle Street, with a short section of open cutting between them. The third tunnel, which opened in 1902, was part of the extension of the line from Heidelberg to Eltham (and later to Hurstbridge). In 2018, the line between Heidelberg and Rosanna was duplicated, with a second tunnel bored adjacent to the original tunnel.

Bunbury Street Tunnel 
The Bunbury Street tunnel in Footscray, Victoria, on the Independent Goods Line runs under Bunbury Street (where it was constructed by cut and fill, but included a section of concrete arch and another with a concrete beam roof), passing under the Williamstown platforms of Footscray station. The line was built in 1924 to alleviate congestion caused by country goods trains on the suburban network.

City Loop 

The Melbourne City Loop was constructed as four separate tunnels. One tunnel between North Melbourne and Flinders Street station, another tunnel between Jolimont and Southern Cross Station, and 2 tunnels between Richmond and Southern Cross station.

The tunnels roughly follow the alignment of Spring Street and Latrobe Street with underground stations at Parliament, Melbourne Central and Flagstaff. The tunnels and stations were constructed between 1971 and 1985.

Narrow-gauge tunnels

The Bump Tunnel 
The Bump tunnel was built on a narrow-gauge tramline near Powelltown, Victoria, to gain access to timber for the sawmills of the district. The Powelltown Tramway ran from Yarra Junction to Powelltown between 1913 and 1945, and formed the collector for numerous timber tramways. One was the Bump Line, which was built in about 1913 with a steep section across the range at the head of the Little Yarra River, using a steam winch-hauled incline. This was replaced in July 1925 to with a 313 metre long tunnel which was about 2.8 m wide and 4.0 m high and took 13 months to dig. It was timber-lined and had a vent shaft in the middle through which smoke escaped. The tunnel was closed as a safety measure after World War II. Both entrances are still visible.

Geelong Cement Works Tunnel 
The narrow-gauge Fyansford Cement Works Railway, which connected the Australian Portland Cement Co's cement works in Fyansford with its limestone quarry, had a 1300 metre long tunnel, the longest rail tunnel in Victoria (excepting the underground sections of the City Loop).

Henry's Tunnels 
Two tunnels were built on a timber tramway linking Henry's Sawmill with the Victorian Railways terminus at Forrest in 1902 and were in use by 1903. They remained in use until about 1927. Steam locomotives hauling logs from the Otway Forest to sawmills, had fold-down funnels to pass through the tunnels.

Table of tunnel lengths and dates

Notes:
 DG = Dual Gauge
 2->1 = Originally 2 tracks, reduced to 1 track.

References

Lists of buildings and structures in Victoria (Australia)
Victoria
Railway tunnels in Victoria (Australia)
Tunnels in Victoria (Australia)
Australian railway-related lists